In Latin, there are multiple periphrases for tense and mode. Here we list the most common.

Perfect periphrasis

The auxiliary varies according to the speech role and number of the subject.

 :  :  = I : was led : by Caesar
 :  :  = you : were led : by Caesar
 :  :  = the man : was led : by Caesar

In contrast, the participle varies according to the gender and number of the subject.

 :  :  = the man : was led : by Caesar
 :  :  = the woman : was led : by Caesar
 :  :  = the boys : were led : by Caesar

However, the supine in the ' infinitive' paradigm does not vary.

 :  :  = that : the man : would be led : by Caesar
 :  :  = that : the woman : would be led : by Caesar
 :  :  = that : the boys : would be led : by Caesar

perfect periphrasis

The auxiliary varies according to the speech role and number of the subject.

 :  :  = I : held : the man : hidden
 :  :  = you : held : the man : hidden
 :  :  = Caesar : held : the man : hidden

The participle varies according to the gender and number of the object.

 :  :  = Caesar : held : the man : hidden
 :  :  = Caesar : held : the woman : hidden
 :  :  = Caesar : held : the boys : hidden

This became the regular way of forming the perfect in French and Italian.

perfect periphrasis

The auxiliary varies according to the speech role and number of the subject.

 :  :  = I : held : the man : hidden
 :  :  = you : held : the man : hidden
 :  :  = Caesar : held : the man : hidden

The participle varies according to the gender and number of the object.

 :  :  = Caesar : held : the man : hidden
 :  :  = Caesar : held : the woman : hidden
 :  :  = Caesar : held : the boys : hidden

Future periphrasis 

The auxiliary varies according to the speech role and number of also the subject.

 :  :  = I : would lead : the man
 :  :  = you : would lead : the man
 :  :  = Caesar : would lead : the man

The participle varies according to the gender and number of the subject.

 :  :  = Caesar : would lead : the man
 :  :  = Aurelia : would lead : the man
 :  :  = Caesar and Aurelia : would lead : the man

Future infinitive periphrases 

The future infinitive periphrases are composed of one of three auxiliaries (or ), the word  and a verb from one of two verb paradigms ('present subjunctive' or 'imperfect subjunctive').

The auxiliary does not vary.

The verb varies according to the speech role and number of the subject.

 :  :  :  = that: I : would lead : the man
 :  :  :  = that: you : would lead : the man
 :  :  :  = that: Caesar : would lead : the man

Gerundive periphrasis

The auxiliary varies according to the speech role and number of the subject.

 :  :  = I : needed to be led : by Caesar
 :  :  = you : needed to be led : by Caesar
 :  :  = the man : needed to be led : by Caesar

The participle varies according to the gender and number of the subject.

 :  :  = the man : needed to be led : by Caesar
 :  :  = the woman : needed to be led : by Caesar
 :  :  = the boys : needed to be led : by Caesar

Although the gerundive periphrasis is similar to the future periphrasis in appearance, they are not parallel in meaning nor function. Woodcock writes of the gerundive periphrasis: 'But for the introduction of the idea of necessity, it would form a periphrastic future passive tense parallel to the periphrastic future active.'

present periphrasis

The auxiliary varies according to the speech role and number of the subject.

 :  :  = I : was leading : the man
 :  :  = you : were leading : the man
 :  :  = Caesar : was leading : the man

The infinitive does not vary.

References

Latin grammar